Qeshlaq (also Romanized as Qeshlāq; also known as Kishlak) is a village in Deylaman Rural District, Deylaman District, Siahkal County, Gilan Province, Iran. At the 2006 census, its population was 218, in 72 families.

References 

Populated places in Siahkal County